Thomas Rhodes Rockwell (born March 13, 1933) is an American author of children's books. 

Rockwell is the son of the American artist Norman Rockwell and his then-wife Mary Rockwell, an unpublished author. He grew up in Arlington, Vermont, a very rural small town. He attended a one-room schoolhouse; there were 23 students in his high school graduating class. His early mentors were Jim and Clara Edgarton, local farmers. He attended Bard College.

He says he always wanted to write. He was the uncredited ghostwriter of his father's autobiography, My Adventures as an Illustrator. He got the idea of writing children's books when he started reading to his own son. His wife Gail illustrated several of his books.

His best-known book is How to Eat Fried Worms (1973), about a boy who accepts a $50 bet to eat one worm per day for 15 days. Although it was rejected by 23 publishers before finally coming out in print, the book sold 3 million copies and received the Mark Twain Award, the California Young Reader Medal, and the Sequoyah Book Award. It was made into an animated TV episode of CBS Storybreak in 1985 and was filmed as a theatrical release in 2006.

He now lives in Poughkeepsie, New York.

Selected publications
 Rackety-bang, and other verses, illustrated by Gail Rockwell (1969)
 Squawwwk!, illustrated by Gail Rockwell (1972) 
 How to Eat Fried Worms (1973) – 
 The Portmanteau Book, illustrated by Gail Rockwell (1994)
 How to Fight a Girl (1987) – sequel to How to Eat Fried Worms
 How to Get Fabulously Rich (1990)

References

External links
 
 
 Gail Rockwell at LC Authorities, with 6 records 1969–76

Living people
1933 births
Norman Rockwell
American people of English descent
People from Bennington County, Vermont
Writers from Poughkeepsie, New York
Place of birth missing (living people)
Bard College alumni
People from Arlington, Vermont